Earl of Bedford is a title that has been created three times in the Peerage of England and is currently a subsidiary title of the Dukes of Bedford. The first creation came in 1138 in favour of Hugh de Beaumont. He appears to have been degraded from the title three or four years after its creation. The existence of his title altogether has been doubted. It is discussed by R. H. C. Davis on the basis of the chronicle evidence. However, it now appears to be accepted by historians that Hugh did receive the earldom of Bedford in 1138.

The second creation came in 1366 in favour of the French nobleman Enguerrand VII, Lord of Coucy. After Richard II came to the throne in 1377, Bedford resigned the title to the Crown. The third creation came in 1550 in favour of John Russell, 1st Baron Russell. For more information on this creation, see Duke of Bedford (1694 creation).

Earls of Bedford, first creation (1138)
Hugh de Beaumont, 1st Earl of Bedford (born 1106)

Earls of Bedford, second creation (1366)
Enguerrand VII, Lord of Coucy, 1st Earl of Bedford (1340–1397) (resigned in 1377)

Earls of Bedford, third creation (1551)
see Duke of Bedford (1694 creation)

See also
Duke of Bedford

References

Earldoms in the Peerage of England
Noble titles created in 1138
Noble titles created in 1366
Noble titles created in 1551